Yoon Seung-hyeon (born 13 December 1988) is a South Korean footballer who plays as a winger for Daejeon Korail in Korea National League.

External links 

1988 births
Living people
Association football midfielders
South Korean footballers
FC Seoul players
Seongnam FC players
Daejeon Korail FC players
NK Istra 1961 players
K League 1 players
Korea National League players
Croatian Football League players
Yonsei University alumni
Expatriate footballers in Croatia
South Korean expatriates in Croatia
Place of birth missing (living people)